Pangong may refer to:

Pangong Lake, endorheic lake in India and China
Pangong range, mountain range in Ladakh, India